Westway is a British television series made by HTV for ITV in 1976.

The series dealt with the lives of three families living together in a commune in Bristol, and explored issues of self-sufficiency also addressed by BBC series of the period such as The Good Life and Survivors.

Cast

Simon Gipps-Kent - Crispin Ryder
Sylvestra Le Touzel as Samantha Ryder
Donald Morley as Pete Ryder
Ann Lynn as Jan Ryder
Ashley Knight as Phil Saxby
Nigel Rhodes as Mark Saxby
Ivor Salter as Len Saxby
Chris Range as Anna Saxby
Dean Lawrence as Ron Harvey
Jane Lowe as Paula Harvey
Sarah Sutton as Sue Harvey
Daphne Heard as Miss. Marlbury
Tim Preece as Graham Lawrence

Episode list

All seven episodes were written by Guy Slater.

The series survives complete on 1" videotape as part of the HTV collection which is now held by ITV plc.

External links
 

1976 British television series debuts
1976 British television series endings
1970s British children's television series
ITV children's television shows
Television series by ITV Studios
Television shows produced by Harlech Television (HTV)
English-language television shows